Marianne Gyllenhammar (1924–2013) was a Swedish film and stage actress. She was married to the actor Rolf Botvid.

Selected filmography
 Tonight or Never (1941)
 There's a Fire Burning (1943)
 Young Blood (1943)
 I Killed (1943)
 Som du vill ha mej (1943)
 The Green Lift (1944)
 Stopp! Tänk på något annat (1944)
 Turn of the Century (1944)
 The Happy Tailor (1945)
 The Balloon (1946)
 How to Love (1947)
 Song of Stockholm (1947)
 Poor Little Sven (1947)
 Music in Darkness (1948)
 Loffe as a Millionaire (1948)
 My Sister and I (1950)
 Stupid Bom (1953)

References

Bibliography
 Paietta, Ann C. Teachers in the Movies: A Filmography of Depictions of Grade School, Preschool and Day Care Educators, 1890s to the Present. McFarland, 2007.
 Steene, Birgitta. Ingmar Bergman: A Reference Guide. Amsterdam University Press, 2005.

External links

1924 births
2013 deaths
Swedish film actresses
Swedish stage actresses